Kyadondo Rugby Club is a rugby union ground in Kampala, Uganda.

It was built in 2000. Facilities include main ground, a training pitch and a club house.

The ground is home to several club teams, among them Heathens RFC, a leading rugby club in Uganda. It has also hosted home games of the Uganda national rugby union team, but the Uganda Rugby Union is considering hosting games at the National Stadium or Nakivubo Stadium due to limited capacity of Kyadondo.

The club has also been a concert venue, Beenie Man is among the high-profile performers.

July 2010 Kampala attacks
Kyadondo Rugby Club was one of the two scenes of the July 2010 Kampala attacks. 
According to eyewitnesses, there was an explosion near the 90th minute of the match, followed seconds later by a second explosion that knocked out the lights at the field. An explosion went off directly in front of a large screen that was showing the telecast from South Africa, killing 49 people. The discovery of a severed head and leg at the rugby field suggests that it was a suicide attack carried out by an individual. A third unexploded vest was later found.

References

External links 
Kyadondo Rugby Club

Sport in Kampala
Sports venues in Uganda
Rugby union in Uganda
Rugby union stadiums in Africa
Terrorist incidents in Uganda
Terrorist incidents in Africa in 2010
Sports venues completed in 2000
2000 establishments in Uganda